Space Network (SN) is a NASA program that combines space and ground elements to support spacecraft communications in Earth vicinity.  The SN Project Office at Goddard Space Flight Center (GSFC) manages the SN, which consists of:
 The geosynchronous Tracking and Data Relay Satellites (TDRS),
 Supporting ground terminal systems,
 The Bilateration Ranging and Transponder System (BRTS),
 Merritt Island Launch Annex (MILA) relay,
 Network Control Center Data System (NCCDS).

Satellite generations

Tracking and Data Relay Satellite (TDRS) currently consists of first-generation (F1–F7), and second-generation (F8–F10) satellites.

The space segment of the SN consists of up to six operational relay satellites in geosynchronous orbit. These communications satellites are allocated longitudes for relaying forward and return service signals to and from customers, any entity with an Earth-orbiting satellite that has an agreement with SN to use its communications services, for data transfer and tracking. An additional TDRS, F1, provides dedicated support to the National Science Foundation (NSF) through the use of the WSC Alternate Relay Terminal (WART). Additional spare TDRSs may be in geosynchronous orbit.

All first-generation TDRSs (F1–F7, also known as TDRS A–G) carry functionally identical payloads and all second-generation TDRSs (F8–F10, also known as TDRS H–J) carry functionally identical payloads.

A third generation, TDRS K, L, and M were launched between 2013–2017.

The figures identify the pertinent communications components and associated parameters of the orbiting relay platforms.

Coverage
For spacecraft operating in a low Earth orbit (LEO) 73 km to 3000 km altitude, the SN is capable of providing tracking and data acquisition services over 100% of the spacecraft's orbit.  Spacecraft sent to more distant or exotic destinations rely on either Deep Space Network or their own custom, dedicated networks.

See also
 Deep Space Network
 Near Earth Network
 Indian Deep Space Network
 Tracking and Data Relay Satellite
 Eastern Range
 SCaN Program

References

External links 
 NASA's Goddard Space Flight Center Space Network Official Page

Goddard Space Flight Center